Tasu Water Aerodrome  was located adjacent to Tasu, British Columbia, Canada.

References 

Defunct seaplane bases in British Columbia